Streptomyces cremeus is a bacterium species from the genus of Streptomyces which has been isolated from the Caucasus region in Russia. Streptomyces cremeus produces cremomycin.

Further reading

See also 
 List of Streptomyces species

References

External links
Type strain of Streptomyces cremeus at BacDive -  the Bacterial Diversity Metadatabase

cremeus
Bacteria described in 1958